Suzana Petersen (born 14 October 1947), later Suzana Gesteira, is a Brazilian former tennis player. She competed at the 1968 Summer Olympics, where tennis was a demonstration and exhibition sport, in the exhibition events. Together with Ecuadorian María Eugenia Guzmán she finished third in the women's doubles exhibition event. Petersen also finished third in the women's singles and mixed doubles (with Teimuraz Kakulia of the Soviet Union) exhibition events, making her one of the "top Brazilian female players". Prior to Laura Pigossi and Luisa Stefani's bronze medal at the 2020 Summer Olympics, Petersen was the only Brazilian player to finish in the top three of an Olympic tennis event.

She participated at Grand Slam tournaments at the 1968 French Open, 1970 French Open, 1969 Wimbledon Championships, 1970 Wimbledon Championships and 1969 US Open. Petersen, from Rio Grande do Sul, was trained by her father at the Clube Sogipa in Porto Alegre.

Petersen defeated Italy's Anna Arias 5-7, 6-3, 8-6 to win the 1970 Parioli tournament.

References

1947 births
Living people
Brazilian female tennis players
Place of birth missing (living people)
Olympic tennis players of Brazil
tennis players at the 1968 Summer Olympics
20th-century Brazilian women
21st-century Brazilian women